Oxford Mail is a daily tabloid newspaper in Oxford, England, owned by Newsquest. It is published six days a week. It is a sister paper to the weekly tabloid The Oxford Times.

History
The Oxford Mail was founded in 1928 as a successor to Jackson's Oxford Journal.

From 1961 until 1979 its editor was Mark Barrington-Ward. At that time it was owned by the Westminster Press, and was an evening newspaper.

The Oxford Mail is now published in the morning. In the second half of 2008 its circulation fell to 23,402, by 2013 it had fallen to 16,569, a year-on-year decline of 5.6% By the second half of 2014, its circulation had fallen to 12,103.

In the period July to December 2015, the paper's circulation fell again, to 11,173. In January to June 2016, a further decline to 10,777 was recorded, an 8.4% fall in year-on-year.

The latest published circulation was 5,504 (January - June 2022).

Notable former staff
 Morley Safer
 Sir David Bell
 Dorothea Frazil, fictional editor in TV series Endeavour

References

1928 establishments in England
Newspapers published in Oxford
Newspapers published by Newsquest
Publications established in 1928